This article is a list of Brazilian states by literacy rate.

List

References

External links 
 Statoids data on Brazilian states
 

Brazil, literacy rate
Literacy rate
Literacy